WBIB (1110 AM) is a radio station licensed to the community of Centreville, Alabama, United States, and serves the greater Tuscaloosa, Alabama, area.  The station is owned by James Deloach.  It airs a Southern Gospel music format which features some programming from Salem Communications.

The station was assigned the WBIB call letters by the Federal Communications Commission.

References

External links

Southern Gospel radio stations in the United States
Bibb County, Alabama
Radio stations established in 1983
BIB
BIB